"Bear Cage" is a 1980 single by The Stranglers. The non-album track (although later released on reissues of The Raven) reached number 36 in the UK Singles Chart.

References

The Stranglers songs
1980 singles
Music videos directed by Russell Mulcahy
1980 songs
United Artists Records singles